South End is a census-designated place in La Prairie Township, Clearwater County, Minnesota, United States. Its population was 25 as of the 2010 census.

Demographics

Education
The community is served by Bagley School District 162.

References

Census-designated places in Clearwater County, Minnesota
Census-designated places in Minnesota